Windham High School is a public high school in the town of Windham, New Hampshire. It is part of School Administration Unit (SAU) 95 and administered by the Windham School District. The high school was established in 2009, and the first graduating class was in 2012.

References

External links
Official website

Public high schools in New Hampshire
Schools in Rockingham County, New Hampshire
Educational institutions established in 2009
Windham, New Hampshire
2009 establishments in New Hampshire